Md. Habibe Millat is a Bangladesh Awami League politician and the incumbent Member of Parliament from Sirajganj-2.

Early life
Millat was born on 15 January 1966. He obtained his MBBS degree from the Mymensingh Medical College in Bangladesh and FRCS degree from the Royal College of Surgeons of Edinburgh. He is also trained in Advanced Cardiothoracic Surgery from Europe's leading hospitals and in Harvard Medical School, Boston, United States.

Career
Millat was re-elected as a member of the Bangladesh Parliament from Sirajganj-2 constituency for the session 2019–2024. He was also the Member of Parliament for previous session. He was elected President of Advisory Group on Health of the Inter Parliamentary Union in June 2015. He has a number of scientific articles published in international medical journals.

Positions held 
Millat has also been involved in numerous national and international organizations. He is also the champion of stopping child marriage and drug abuse, promoting health security for all, women and youth empowerment. Some of his current engagement mention below:

 Chairman, Health Advisory Group, Inter-Parliamentary Union (IPU)
 Vice Chairman, Bangladesh Red Crescent Society (BDRCS)
 Vice Chairman, Bangladesh Medical Research Council (BMRC)
 Member, Standing Committee, Ministry of Foreign Affairs
 Member, Standing Committee, Ministry of Science and Technology
 Governing Board Member, International Federation of Red Cross & Red Crescent Society (IFRC)
 Member, Bangladesh Association of Parliamentarians on Population & Development (BAPPD)
 Member, Commonwealth Parliamentary Association (CPA), Bangladesh Chapter
 Central Committee Member, Swadhinata Chikitsak Parishad (SWACHIP)
 Senate Member, Rabindra University, Bangladesh
 Professor, Cardiac Surgery, Ibrahim Cardiac Hospital, Dhaka
 Goodwill Ambassador, Bangladesh National Cadet Corps (BNCC)
Advisor, SANDHANI Central Committee

References

Awami League politicians
Living people
1966 births
10th Jatiya Sangsad members
11th Jatiya Sangsad members